Derek Burney is the former president of Corel Corporation.

In 1988, at the age of 26, Burney entered the Computer Science program at Carleton University, spending co-op terms at Nortel and Atomic Energy of Canada Limited (AECL). He began his career with Corel as a developer and, with the help of his mentor Michael Cowpland, rose quickly through the ranks, eventually heading the engineering department and becoming President and Chief executive officer following Cowpland's resignation in 2000.

After taking the company private with Vector Capital, Burney held the position of Chairman until he resigned to join Microsoft in 2004.

Burney is currently corporate vice president of Customer Technical Engagement in Microsoft's Worldwide Commercial Business.

Burney's father, Derek Burney Sr., is a noted Canadian businessperson and diplomat.

References

External links
 Carleton University alumni profile from 2001

Canadian businesspeople
Carleton University alumni
Year of birth missing (living people)
Living people
Corel
Nortel people